Jordan Geist (born July 21, 1998) is an American shot putter. In 2019, he won the silver medal in the men's shot put event at the 2019 Pan American Games held in Lima, Peru.

Early life 
Geist went to Knoch High School were he set the PA State High School Records for Shot Put and Discus.

Career 

In 2017, he won the gold medal in the shot put event at the 2017 Pan American U20 Athletics Championships held in Trujillo, Peru.

In 2019, he won the bronze medal in the shot put event at the 2019 NCAA Division I Outdoor Track and Field Championships held at Mike A. Myers Stadium in Austin, Texas. A month later, he competed at the 2019 NACAC U18 and U23 Championships in Athletics winning the gold medal this time.

In 2023, he became a National Champion in the shot put event at the NCAA Division I indoor track and field championships in Albuquerque, NM.

International competitions

References

External links 
 

Living people
1998 births
Place of birth missing (living people)
American male shot putters
Athletes (track and field) at the 2019 Pan American Games
Medalists at the 2019 Pan American Games
Pan American Games silver medalists for the United States
Pan American Games medalists in athletics (track and field)
Pan American Games track and field athletes for the United States
Arizona Wildcats men's track and field athletes
Track and field athletes from Pennsylvania
People from Butler, Pennsylvania